The All Girl Band (TAG) is Pakistan's only all-female band. The band was founded in 2016 with its members including Anna Salman Dar on lead vocals and guitars, Amal Nadeem on the violin, Mishal Faheem on drums, and Sumera Waris on the tabla.

Details and songs 
TAG featured the first female tabla player of Pakistan (Sumera Waris) as well as the first Pakistani female drummer (Mishal Faheem).

The band acquired massive fame by making a cover song of the John Newman’s original Love Me Again in the fourth season of Nescafe Basement. Newman appreciated the song himself by posting praise phrases on his Twitter account. TAG has also performed with the Romanian dance pop band 'Akcent'.

TAG is famous for performing cover songs and mash-ups in addition to producing originals. Their lead vocalist, Anna Salman was chosen in the Best Emerging Talent category at the 2019 Lux Style Awards for a song called 'Middle of Nowhere' which was done by them in the second season of Levi's Live.

Besides the band's appearances in Nescafe Basement, they have mashed up John Newman's Love Me Again with the Game of Thrones title track. Another great mash-up by the talented girls is 'Are You With Me' by 'Lost Frequencies' with 'Laree Chotee' by the Pakistani rock band ‘Call’.

'Mehbooba', originally sung by Haroon Rashid is a cover song done by TAG. They have recorded a song 'Choo Liya Aasman' in collaboration with women's lifestyle brand ‘Khaadi’. Other cover songs include Jimmy Khan's Baarish, Jason Mraz’s I'm Yours, Strings's Mera Bichra Yaar & Sajni, Uzair Jaswal's Tere Bin, Sajjad Ali's Tum Naraz Ho, Bilal Khan's Bachana and Taylor Swift’s The Man among others. TAG has over 1 million views on YouTube.

Social representation 
TAG have held sessions and TED Talks regarding reducing gender stereotypes in the music industry of Pakistan in Lahore University of Management Sciences (LUMS) and the University of Central Punjab (UCP) in Lahore.

References 

Pakistani musical groups
Pakistani pop music groups
All-female bands